Medicago carstiensis is a plant species of the genus Medicago. It is found around the Adriatic Sea.

External links
 International Legume Database & Information Services

carstiensis